Orléans is a city in north-central France, about 100 km south-west of Paris.

Orleans may also refer to:

Places

Brazil
Orleans, Santa Catarina

Canada
Île d'Orléans, an island in the St. Lawrence River near Québec city
Orleans, Ontario, a community which became part of the city of Ottawa in 2001
Orléans (electoral district)
Orléans (provincial electoral district)

United States
Orleans, California
Orleans, former name of Orleans Flat, California
Orleans, Indiana
Orleans, Iowa
Orleans, Massachusetts, a New England town
Orleans (CDP), Massachusetts, village in the town
Orleans, Minnesota
Orleans, Missouri
Orleans, Nebraska
Orleans, New York
Orleans, Vermont
New Orleans, Louisiana, terminus with Orleans Parish
Orleans County (disambiguation)
Orleans Township (disambiguation)

Other uses
Orleans (band), a 1970s rock band
Orléans (grape), a white grape variety
Orleans (software framework), a framework for building scalable and robust distributed applications
Orleans (TV series), a 1997 CBS television series
Orléans Express, Canadian bus operator
The Orleans, a hotel and casino in Las Vegas, Nevada
US Orléans, a French football club
Canal d'Orléans, a canal in France
Charlotte Orléans, a fictional character
"Orleans", a song by the American band Bright from the album The Miller Fantasies

See also
Duke of Orléans
House of Orléans, French royal family
Orleans station (disambiguation)
Orlean (disambiguation)